Eros in Chains (German: Eros in Ketten) is a 1929 Austrian-German silent drama film directed by Conrad Wiene and starring Emmy Flemmich, Maly Delschaft and Walter Slezak.

Cast
 Emmy Flemmich as Frau Maria Reinke  
 Maly Delschaft as Lilo - ihre Tochter  
 Walter Slezak as Heinz Ewer  
 Christian Holt as Rechnungsrat Faber  
 Anita Dorris as Maria, seine Tochter  
 Bert Torren as Kurt Merkel  
 Lizzi Natzler as Luise  
 Trude Fiedler-Seitz as Frau Immergrün  
 Paul Askonas as Vorsitzender des Jugendgerichts  
 Karl Weidinger as Der Leiter des Heimes  
 Marianne Wulff as Die Oberschwester  
 Karl Tema as Ein Dienstmann  
 Tylda Und Lee as Ein Tanzpaar  
Paul Frank as Der Polizeikommissar  
 Hanns Marschall as Ein Detektiv

References

Bibliography
 Robert Dassanowsky. Austrian Cinema: A History. McFarland, 2005.
 Siegbert Salomon Prawer. Blaue Engel. British Film Institute, 2002.

External links

1929 films
Films of the Weimar Republic
German silent feature films
German drama films
Films directed by Conrad Wiene
Austrian drama films
1929 drama films
Austrian silent feature films
German black-and-white films
Austrian black-and-white films
Silent drama films
1920s German films
1920s German-language films